San Pedro (Santistevan) is a town and small municipalities in Bolivia.

References

Populated places in Santa Cruz Department (Bolivia)